Woolsey Teller (March 22, 1890 – March 11, 1954) was an American atheist rationalist writer and white supremacist.

Biography

Teller was born in Brooklyn, New York. He was an associate editor of the leading Freethought journal The Truth Seeker of New York City, where his cousin Charles Lee Smith was editor. He was a member of the American Association for the Advancement of Atheism.  He was well versed in history, theology, and science, and his writings are a model of rational thought, loaded with appropriate quotations showing extensive reading of sources, and were very popular with readers.  He was a diehard materialist, who didn't accept any kind of spiritual dimension to the universe.

Besides being a leader in the American Freethought movement, Teller was a white supremacist, and favored eugenics, causing the movement to split on this issue and losing The Truth Seeker subscribers when its editors backed him.

Teller argued that the white race is superior. with a bigger brain size compared to the black race, which he labeled genetically inferior, always citing scientific justification. Though an Anti-Semite, he greatly admired Albert Einstein for his rejection of religion.  Teller has been described as a "leading freethought bigot".

In his essay "Mysticism in Modern Physics" in Essays of an Atheist, Teller disputes the idea that modern physics has dispensed with materialism, claiming that excessive use of mathematics has turned it into metaphysics:

In his essay "Miscellaneous Notes" in Essays of an Atheist, Teller ridicules mathematics as a way to become wiser in itself:

In October 1947 Teller debated James D. Bales on the existence of God.

Publications

Evolution--or McCann (Truth Seeker Company, 1922)
''The Atheism of Astronomy'' (Truth Seeker Company, 1938)
Essays of an Atheist (Truth Seeker Company, 1945)
Bales-Teller Debate: The Existence Of God (1948)
Hell: A Christian Doctrine (Truth Seeker Company, 1953) [with Marshall Gauvin and Herbert Cutner]

References

External links

Online publications - Internet Infidels

1890 births
1954 deaths
American atheists
American eugenicists
American white supremacists
Critics of Christianity
Critics of creationism
Freethought writers
People from Brooklyn